Alpha Chamaeleontis, Latinized from α Chamaeleontis, is a solitary star in the southern circumpolar constellation of Chamaeleon. It has an apparent visual magnitude of 4.06 and thus is bright enough to be seen with the naked eye. With an annual parallax shift of 51.12 mas, it is located 63.8 light years from the Sun. The star is drifting closer with a radial velocity of −13 km/s, and is predicted to come to within  in 666,000 years.

It has an estimated 1.4 times the mass of the Sun, 2.1 times the Sun's radius, and radiates 7.5 times the solar luminosity from its outer atmosphere at an effective temperature of 6,580 K. The star is around 1.8 billion years old with a projected rotational velocity that is too low to be measured. The star has been examined for an infrared excess that would suggest the presence of an orbiting debris disk, but none was found.

References

F-type main-sequence stars
Chamaeleon (constellation)
Chamaeleontis, Alpha
Durchmusterung objects
0305
071243
040702
03318